Wayne Gilbert is a Canadian working in Vancouver, British Columbia, now Head of the Character Animation Program at Vancouver Institute of Media Arts (VanArts). He was the Senior Animation Director for EA Blackbox, where he directed and animated in-game and cinematics for the ground-breaking video games "skate and skate2". His computer-animated short Let Go won a Crystal Heart Award at the Heartland Film Festival. It was his second film created while working at ILM. The first was CPU. Before that, he created 2D shorts entitled Bottoms Up and Traffic Jam, accepted into the Annecy International Animated Film Festival. He authored two highly respected books, Simplified Drawing for Planning Animation and Planning Character Animation (www.anamie.com). @waynefrederickg (Twitter)

Wayne is currently writing and illustrating picture books and has completed two middle-grade fantasy novels.

Before moving to Vancouver, Wayne spent nine years in northern California, where he worked at Industrial Light and Magic as a Senior Lead Animator on several films, including Star Wars: Episode II – Attack of the Clones and The Mummy Returns, Bounty Hunter (cinematics lead and animator), and numerous commercials, two of which won Clio Awards.

Wayne coordinated and taught in the renowned Classical Animation and International Summer-school of Animation Programs at Sheridan College. Before that worked as a Background Illustrator and Assistant Animator at Leach Rankin Studios on Witch's Night Out, then at Nelvana Ltd as an Assistant, Animator, and Background Illustrator on seven half-hour television shows and numerous commercials. He took on the roles of Background Illustrator and department head on the feature, Rock and Rule. Wayne twice served as an art director at Wang Films in Taiwan. In 1996, Lenora Hume, Sr VP at Walt Disney Studios, brought Wayne on board to help set up the Disney Canada Studios by supervising creative staffing and professional development. He was asked to co-direct the studio's second DVD feature but opted for a move to ILM.

Gilbert graduated from Sheridan College's Classical Animation Program. He has lectured at schools and universities around the world.

Gilbert has an MFA (Master of Film and Animation) USA accreditation.

Notes

References
People/Animation Faculty, deanza.edu .

External links
Official site

Heartland's page on Gilbert's Let Go short

Canadian animators
Sheridan College animation program alumni
Living people
 Year of birth missing (living people)